Edøyfjorden is a fjord (more technically, a strait) in the Nordmøre region of Møre og Romsdal county, Norway. Some of the major islands include Smøla, Edøya, and Kuli on the north side and Tustna, Stabblandet, Solskjeløya, Ertvågsøya, and Grisvågøya on the south side. The fjord flows into the Norwegian Sea on its southwestern end and into the Trondheimsleia and Ramsøyfjorden on the northeastern end.

See also
 List of Norwegian fjords

References

Fjords of Møre og Romsdal
Smøla
Aure, Norway